The 12th RAPID Division is a division of the Indian Army. It was formed during World War II in January 1943, in Persia. It was renamed South Persia Area in January 1945. During the war it had 34th Indian Infantry Brigade, 39th Indian Infantry Brigade, and 60th Indian Infantry Brigade under command.

The division was formed again on 3 November 1966 from forces in the Barmer sector of the border with Pakistan. In December 1971 the 12th was under Southern Command, with the 30th, 45th and 322nd Infantry Brigades. Today the Arjun MBT is entering service with 140th Armoured Brigade, 12th RAPID Division in Jaisalmer. The two Arjun units have been reported as the 43 Armoured Regiment (Jaisalmer) and 75 Armoured Regiment (Jaisalmer).

References

Indian World War II divisions
Divisions of the Indian Army
British Indian Army divisions
Military units and formations established in 1943
Military units and formations of the British Empire in World War II
Military units and formations disestablished in 1945
Military units and formations established in 1966